Plataea polychroma is a species of geometrid moth in the family Geometridae. It is found in North America.

The MONA or Hodges number for Plataea polychroma is 6921.2.

References

Further reading

 
 

Ourapterygini
Articles created by Qbugbot
Moths described in 2010